Sakshi Pradhan (pronounced as sahk-shee pruh-dhaan) is an Indian TV actress, model and a travel host. She started her career at the age of 18 and won season 2 of the reality show MTV Splitsvilla. In 2018, Sakshi hosted the travel show Kissed By The Sea: Mauritius on Travelxp. She is known for playing the character of Rani in Poison (2019), a web series by ZEE5.

Filmography

Television

TV Host

Films

Web series

References

External links

Living people
21st-century Indian actresses
Indian film actresses
Indian voice actresses
Actresses from New Delhi
1992 births